Berend Schabus (born 7 October 1957) is an Austrian speed skater. He competed in three events at the 1976 Winter Olympics.

References

External links
 

1957 births
Living people
Austrian male speed skaters
Olympic speed skaters of Austria
Speed skaters at the 1976 Winter Olympics
People from Wolfsberg
Sportspeople from Carinthia (state)